Sergio Armando Villaseñor Robles (born 12 March 1987) is a Mexican footballer who currently plays for Charlotte Eagles in the USL Professional Division.

Career
After about five seasons in Mexico, Villaseñor moved to the United States and joined USL Premier Development League club El Paso Patriots where he made 15 appearances and scored 5 goals for the club in 2012.  Following his stint in El Paso, Villaseñor joined USL Pro club Charlotte Eagles for the 2013 season.  He made his debut for the Eagles on April 13 in a 2–0 win over Antigua Barracuda FC.

References

1987 births
Living people
Mexican expatriate footballers
Mexican footballers
Footballers from Jalisco
CD Oro footballers
Indios de Ciudad Juárez footballers
El Paso Patriots players
Charlotte Eagles players
Association football midfielders
Expatriate soccer players in the United States
USL League Two players
USL Championship players